Meylandt Castle is a country house, on the site of an earlier castle, in Heusden in the municipality of Heusden-Zolder, province of Limburg, Belgium.

Although the site has been in use since the 1380s at the latest, the present building was constructed in 1907, replacing an earlier house of 1842.

See also
List of castles in Belgium

External links
Meylandt Castle

Castles in Belgium
Castles in Limburg (Belgium)
Heusden-Zolder